The 1896 Southern Intercollegiate Athletic Association football season was the college football games played by the members schools of the Southern Intercollegiate Athletic Association as part of the 1896 college football season. The season began on October 3.

Coach Pop Warner's conference champion Georgia team beat North Carolina 24–16 in a close game. "For the first time in Southern football history the football supremacy of Virginia and North Carolina was successfully challenged." Against John Heisman's Auburn team, Georgia also had the first successful onside kick in the South.

The LSU Tigers, led by coach Allen Jeardeau, went undefeated and were the SIAA co-champions.

Season overview

Results and team statistics

Key

PPG = Average of points scored per game

PAG = Average of points allowed per game

Regular season

SIAA teams in bold.

Week One

Week Two

Week Three

Week Four

Week Five

Week Six

Week Seven

Week Eight

Week Nine

Week Ten

Week Eleven

References